Costești is a commune in Iași County, Western Moldavia, Romania. It is composed of two villages, Costești and Giurgești. These belonged to Târgu Frumos town until 2004, when they were split off to form a separate commune.

References

Communes in Iași County
Localities in Western Moldavia